Abdullino (Abdulla) is a rural locality (a village) in Igmetovsky Selsoviet of Ilishevsky District, Bashkortostan, Russia. The population was 285 as of 2010. There are 4 streets.

Geography 
Abdullino is located 29 km southeast of Verkhneyarkeyevo (the district's administrative centre) by road. Igmetovo is the nearest rural locality.

Ethnicity 
The village is inhabited by Bashkirs and others.

References 

Rural localities in Ilishevsky District